India–Italy relations are the international relations that exist between India and Italy. Historically, trade dates back to the era of the Roman Empire. India maintains an Embassy in Rome, and a Consulate-General in Milan. Italy has an embassy in New Delhi, and Consulate-Generals in Mumbai and Kolkata.

Early history

Indo-Roman relations 

Relations between India and Italy date back to ancient times. Works from authors such as Diodorus Siculus' Library of History, Arrian's Indika, and Pliny the Elder's Natural History make references to India.

Middle Ages 
Relations and trade between the Mediterranean and India ended after the fall of the Roman Empire, but resumed after a few centuries. Marco Polo published his travelogue The Travels of Marco Polo in which he described the life and customs in India at the end of the 13th century.

Many other notable Venetians also visited India. Niccolò de' Conti left Venice in 1419 to visit the Middle East, Persia and then India.

British Raj 
During the British Raj, trade and travel between India and Italy reduced significantly due to prevailing political conditions. Italian scholars participated in Sanskrit studies, and Gaspare Gorresio created the first Chair of Sanskrit in Italy at the University of Turin in 1852. Gorresio translated the Ramayana into Italian. It was published as Ramayana, poema indiano di Valmichi in ten volumes between 1843 and 1858. The Italian unification movement inspired some Indian freedom fighters, and the works of the Italian patriot Giuseppe Mazzini were translated and widely read by Indian intelligentsia.

In the 1940s, during World War II, the British brought Italian prisoners of war, who were captured in either Europe or North Africa, to Bangalore and Madras. They were put up at the Garrison Grounds, today's Parade Grounds-Cubbon Road area.[4] In February 1941, about 2,200 Italian prisoners of war arrived in Bangalore by a special train and were marched to internment camps at Byramangala, 20 miles from Bangalore.[5]

Indian forces played a role in liberating Italy from Nazi control. India contributed the 3rd largest Allied contingent in the Italian campaign after US and British forces. The 4th, 8th and 10th Divisions and 43rd Gurkha Infantry Brigade led the advance, notably at the gruelling Battle of Monte Cassino.

Modern history
Diplomatic relations between the Republic of India and the Italian Republic were established in 1947. Indian Prime Minister Jawaharlal Nehru visited Italy in 1953. President Oscar Luigi Scalfaro was the first Italian head of state to visit India in February 1995. President Carlo Azeglio Ciampi visited India in February 2005.

Romano Prodi became the first Italian Prime Minister to visit India in February 2007. Indian Prime Minister Manmohan Singh visited Italy to attend the 35th G8 summit at L'Aquila in July 2009. External Affairs Minister S.M. Krishna represented India at the 150th anniversary celebrations of the unification of Italy in Rome In June 2011.

After some years of tensions due to the case of the two Italian marines accused of killing two fishermen off the coast of Kerala, the two countries revived normal relations thanks to Prime Ministers Paolo Gentiloni and Narendra Modi. The two leaders described Gentiloni's visit in India in 2017 as a "new beginning" and a great opportunity for both countries.

Economic relations

Bilateral trade

Bilateral trade between India and Italy grew by 12 times in the 2 decades between 1991 and 2011, from EUR 708 million to EUR 8.5 billion. Bilateral trade began experiencing a decline from 2012, decreasing to €7.1 billion in 2012 and €6.95 billion in 2013.

On November 29, 2017, India and Italy signed a memorandum of understanding (MoU) for enhancing bilateral cooperation in the health sector.
This MoU was signed between Union Health Minister J P Nadda and the visiting Italian Health Minister Beatrice Lorenzin.
The MoU envisages cooperation in health sector by pooling in technical, financial and human resources for accomplishing the ultimate objective to upgrade infrastructural resources, medical education and research in both countries.
Activities to be carried out under the scope of this MoU include exchange and training of doctors, setting up of health care facilities and promotion of business development opportunities in pharmaceuticals.

Foreign direct investment
Italian companies invested €694 million in India in 2011, and over €1 billion in 2012. As of December 2012, Italy had an accumulated investment of €3.75 billion in India, or 9% of the total European Union FDI in India.

Indian investment in Italy grew from €584  million in 2004 to €10 billion in 2011. Italy accounted for 2.3% of India's total investment in the European Union.

See also
 Roam Rome Mein
 Indians in Italy
 Italians in India
 Arikamedu
 Roberto de Nobili

References

Further reading
Meenakshi Jain, The India They Saw : Foreign accounts (co-edited with Sandhya Jain, 4 Volumes, Prabhat Prakashan), .
Majumdar, R. C. (1981). The Classical accounts of India: Being a compilation of the English translations of the accounts left by Herodotus, Megasthenes, Arrian, Strabo, Quintus, Diodorus, Siculus, Justin, Plutarch, Frontinus, Nearchus, Apollonius, Pliny, Ptolemy, Aelian, and others with maps. Calcutta: Firma KLM.

External links

 Embassy of India in Rome 
 Embassy of Italy in New Delhi

 
Italy
Bilateral relations of Italy